Thought About Growing Up is an EP by Ohio-based pop punk band Mixtapes.

Track listing

Personnel
Ryan Rockwell – vocals, guitar, keyboard
Maura Weaver – vocals, guitar
Michael Remley – bass
Boone Haley – drums

References

2010 EPs